Karl Förster (9 March 1784 – 27 November 1841) was a German poet and translator.

Biography
He was born at Naumburg, a son of Johann Christian Förster, preacher in the cathedral in that city. After studying theology and philosophy at Leipzig, he was appointed professor of the German language and literature at the Military Academy in Dresden in 1807. He completed Wilhelm Müller's Bibliothek der deutschen Dichter des 17ten Jahrhunderts, and wrote many poems, several of which have been set to music. They were collected and published in 1843. His translations from the classic poets of Italy were also celebrated.

Notes

References

 Karl August Förster's translation of Dante's Divine Comedy, canto V (Francesca da Rimini) at academia.edu

1784 births
1841 deaths
German poets
German male poets
German male non-fiction writers
19th-century German translators